William Robson Storey  (16 July 1936 – 2 August 2019), generally known as Rob Storey, was a New Zealand politician. He was an MP from 1984 to 1996, representing the National Party. He was first elected to Parliament in the 1984 election as MP for Waikato, and retained that seat until his departure from Parliament at the 1996 election. He served for a time as a junior minister, overseeing the merger of the Ministry of Transport's traffic enforcement fleet into the New Zealand Police in 1993.

Before entering politics, Storey was a farmer at Waiterimu in the Waikato, and was the president of Federated Farmers from 1981 to 1984. He was educated at Wesley College, Auckland.

In the 2007 New Year Honours, Storey was appointed a Companion of the Queen's Service Order for public services. He died in Te Awamutu on 2 August 2019.

References

The First 50 Years: A History of the New Zealand National Party by Barry Gustafson (1986, Reed Methuen, Auckland) 

1936 births
2019 deaths
Members of the Cabinet of New Zealand
New Zealand farmers
New Zealand National Party MPs
People educated at Wesley College, Auckland
New Zealand MPs for North Island electorates
Members of the New Zealand House of Representatives
Companions of the Queen's Service Order